Illyrians may refer to:

 ancient Illyrians in Southeastern Europe
 population of ancient Illyria
 population of Roman Illyricum
 people speaking the so-called Illyrian (South Slavic)
 population of French Illyrian Provinces
 population of Austrian Kingdom of Illyria
 followers of the Illyrian movement in the first half of the 19th century

Arts and entertainment
Illyrians, a fictional race of humanoids, including the character Una Chin-Riley, in the Star Trek franchise

See also
 Illyria (disambiguation)
 Illyrian (disambiguation)
 Illyricum (disambiguation)
 Illyricus (disambiguation) 

Language and nationality disambiguation pages